Eilema strangulata is a moth of the subfamily Arctiinae. It was first described by Joseph de Joannis in 1930 and is found in Vietnam.

References

 

strangulata